Xiong Kuang (reigned 11th century BC) was an early ruler of the state of Chu during the early Zhou Dynasty (1046–256 BC) of ancient China.  He succeeded his father Xiong Li, and was succeeded by his son Xiong Yi, who would later be enfeoffed by King Cheng of Zhou and granted the hereditary noble rank of viscount.

References

Monarchs of Chu (state)
11th-century BC Chinese monarchs
Year of birth unknown
Year of death unknown